Küre Mountains National Park, established on July 7, 2000, is a national park in northern Turkey. The national park stretches over the mountain range of Küre Mountains and is located in the districts Pınarbaşı, Cide, Şenpazar in Kastamonu Province and Ulus in Bartın Province.

Gallery

References

National parks of Turkey
Mountain ranges of Turkey
Geography of Kastamonu Province
Geography of Bartın Province
Landforms of Kastamonu Province
Landforms of Bartın Province
Tourist attractions in Kastamonu Province
Tourist attractions in Bartın Province
Pınarbaşı District, Kastamonu
Cide District
Şenpazar District
Ulus District
2000 establishments in Turkey
Protected areas established in 2000